Altia Herrera Michel (1929–1994) was a Mexican singer, dancer and film actress, who never took a movie role unless it was written specifically for her, where she used her own name, or an alternative spelling Althia Michel.

Life and career
She was born in Mexico City. Due to her physical beauty and height—5 foot 8 inches, she was cast in movies as a sex symbol and quickly became "type-cast" as a femme fatale.

She began her career singing in nightclubs and theaters, where she performed many times with Russian – Mexican controversial violinist Elias Breeskin who had been released from a thirteen-year incarceration at Islas Marías Federal Prison on the Islas Marías archipelago off the coast of Nayarit, where he had shared a cell with Ramón Mercader, the Spanish born communist who had worked as a Soviet agent in 1940 to assassinate Leon Trotsky. The ever passionate Breeskin, had been married before, and from his marriages he fathered six children. Of his offspring, Olga Breeskin followed her father's footsteps into music. Altia was discovered through her nightclub and theater performances and signed to a movie contract in 1952. Her first movie role was in “El fronterizo,” a comedy western.

Of the ten movies that she appeared in, several have become cult classics; most notably the 1967 film entitled “The Empire of Dracula.” An adaptation of Bram Stoker’s novel the screen play written by Luis Enrique Vergara, starring Eric de Castillo as Baron Draculstein, the part of Diana portrayed by Ethel Carrillo, and Altia Michel played Atilia Michel, a beautiful vampire who tried to lure Luis Brener, performed by César del Campo, into the Dracula’s castle with the intent to feed on his blood.

In 1958, she participated in one of the first Mexican movies filmed in color entitled “Música de siempre.” The National Association of Actors financed the film in order to give jobs to hundreds of actors, actresses, musicians, stagehands, grips, soundmen, writers and more who became unemployed from Mexico City Regent Ernesto P. Uruchurtu’s siege on the entertainment industry. Although there were many famous entertainers in the movie such as Edith Piaf, Agustin Lara, Alejandro Algara, Libertad Lamarque, Toña la Negra, comedians Manuel Valdes his brother German Valdes, and nine-year-old Angelica Maria, but Altia Michel stole the show when she played the part of an announcer of a commercial that sold egg-based hair shampoo.  She wore a tight sweater and short-shorts that had a flirty little ruffle attached to the back part of the shorts. In four inch black high-heeled shoes, no one could take their eyes from her Betty Grable legs and her Marilyn Monroe figure as she walked across the stage.

Known for her figure and her legs, the new era of professional wrestling movies, also known as Mexican super hero films, where strong bare chest men in tights showed off their muscles, Altia was cast opposite as the beautiful well-formed femme fatal. “These films became the staples of Mexican Cinema combining action, horror, sex, science fiction and comedy in a bizarre amalgam aimed to please the whole family.” 

The era of professional wrestling brought to the movie screen the Mexican super hero films that included Mil Máscaras, Demonio Azul and Santo movies. Altia appeared in the “Demonio Azul” produced by Luis Enrique Vergara, starring Demonio Azul a.k.a. Alejandro Munoz Moreno in 1965. El Santo made several films for Vergara, but after a contractual dispute, he walked off the set. The producer did not hesitate to come up with another wrestler to take El Santo's place. He invented “El Demonio Azul” or the Blue Demon. In the film “Blue Demon,” Altia played the part of a flirtatious sensual waitress, who after work at the restaurant was escorted home by a customer. Upon leaving her at her home, the customer later turns into a werewolf, played by Jaime Fernandez. The werewolf was seen peering into her bedroom window where he saw Altia take off her clothes in a soft strip-tease that left her wearing a black lace bra and panties. The werewolf breaks into the bedroom and begins to murder Altia. The next scene switches to the following day where the police discuss her murder. “Obviously, some cuts appear to have been made."

In 1969 she again appeared in a cult classic wrestling movie entitled “Mil Máscaras,” produced by Luis Enrique Vergara and starring Aaron Rodriguez. Horror movies became popular during the late 1960s. Altia appeared in “Atacan las brujas” and “Los canallas” both produced by Luis Enrique Vergara in 1968.

After film producer Luis Enrique Vergara died from a heart attack in 1969, Altia did not appear in any other movies. She continued to perform in nightclubs and theaters throughout Mexico and in the border towns in the United States.

Personal life
She married singer Gualberto Castro in 1954, together they had one daughter in 1958. They divorced in 1959.

Death

As a lifetime smoker, she died from complications of lung disease.

Filmography
El fronterizo (1952), comedy-western
La alegre casada (1952), comedy released on 1952
Escuela para suegras (School for Mothers-in-Law) (1958)
Música de siempre (1958) produced by the A.N.D.A.
Blue Demon, el demonio azul (1965) produced by Luis Enrique Vergara starring Alejandro Munoz Moreno
The Empire of Dracula (1967), screenplay by Luis Enrique Vergara
Atacan las brujas (1968) produced by Luis Enrique Vergara
Los canallas (The Scoundrels) (1968); aka "The Swine", "Hell's Angels" or "Angeles Infernales"; produced by Luis Enrique Vergara
Mil Máscaras (1969) director Jaime Salvador, starring Aaron Rodriguez as Mil Máscaras, and Eric de Castillo
Enigma de muerte (Enigma of Death) (1969) (co-starring John Carradine)

References

External links

1929 births
1994 deaths
20th-century Mexican actresses
Mexican film actresses
Actresses from Mexico City